Thomas S. Smith may refer to:
 Thomas S. Smith (educator) (1921–2004), 13th president of Lawrence University
 Thomas S. Smith (politician) (1917–2002), American politician
 Thomas Southwood Smith (1788–1861), English physician